Harry Heaney is an Emeritus Professor of Organic Chemistry at Loughborough University. His research centres on heterocyclic compounds containing nitrogen.

See also
Harry Kroto

External links
Prof Heaney's Staff Page

British chemists
Academics of Loughborough University
Living people
Year of birth missing (living people)
Place of birth missing (living people)
Alumni of the University of Manchester